The 1995 Peterborough City Council election took place on 4 May 1995 to elect members of Peterborough City Council in England. This was on the same day as other local elections.

Election result

Ward results

Bretton

Central

Dogsthorpe

East

Eye

Fletton

Newborough

North

Northborough

Orton Longueville

Orton Waterville

Park

Ravensthorpe

Stanground

Walton

West

References

1995
1990s in Cambridgeshire
Peterborough